Zhu Juefeng (born May 5, 1964) is a former female Chinese handball player who competed in the 1984 Summer Olympics.

She was a member of the Chinese handball team which won the bronze medal. She played all five matches and scored ten goals.

External links
profile

1964 births
Living people
Chinese female handball players
Handball players at the 1984 Summer Olympics
Olympic bronze medalists for China
Olympic handball players of China
Olympic medalists in handball
Medalists at the 1984 Summer Olympics